Assist or ASSIST may refer to:

Sports
Several sports have a statistic known as an "assist", generally relating to action by a player leading to a score by another player on their team:
Assist (basketball), a pass by a player that facilitates a basket by another
Assist (ice hockey), a pass by a player or players that helps set up a goal
Assist (association football), a pass by a player or players that helps set up a goal
Assist in Australian rules football, the last pass by a player that directly helps set up a goal
Assist (baseball), any touching of the ball by a defensive player after it has been hit by the batter and prior to the recording of a putout
Assist in water polo, the last pass by a player that directly helps set up a goal
Assist in ultimate, a pass by a player on which a goal is scored.

Other
 The World Health Organization's Alcohol, Smoking and Substance Involvement Screening Test (ASSIST) Project
 ASSIST (computing), Assembler System for Student Instruction and Systems Teaching
 Assist (Scientology), Scientology practices
 ASSIST (student exchange organization), American Secondary Schools for International Students and Teachers
 aSSIST (university), Seoul School of Integrated Sciences and Technologies

See also
 
 
 Assistance (disambiguation)
 Assistant (disambiguation)